This is a list of hotel-related list articles.

By type

 List of casino hotels
 List of chained-brand hotels
 List of largest hotels
 List of tallest hotels

By country

Hotels are indexed by country in alphabetical order and are mainly five or four star hotels, notable skyscraper landmarks or historic hotels, which are covered in multiple reliable publications.

By city

China
 List of hotels in Beijing

India
 List of hotels in Bengaluru
 List of hotels in Chennai

Philippines
 List of hotels in Metro Manila

Turkey
 Hotels in Istanbul

United Arab Emirates
 List of hotels in Dubai

United Kingdom
 Hotels in London

United States
 List of Las Vegas Strip hotels
 List of hotels in Los Angeles
 List of hotels in New York City
 List of former hotels in Manhattan

By region
 List of hotels in the Caribbean

Miscellaneous
 List of defunct hotel chains
 List of motels

See also

 Hilton Hotel (disambiguation)
 List of lists
 Union Hotel (disambiguation)

 
Lists of buildings and structures by type

Tourism-related lists
Lists of lists